Priit Pedajas (born 21 January 1954 in Tallinn) is an Estonian actor and theatre director.

In 1976, he graduated from the Tallinn State Conservatory' Performing Arts Department. From 1979 until 1985, he was an actor and director at Ugala Theatre. From 1985 until 1991, he was a director at Endla Theatre. From 1991 until 1999, he was the director of the Estonian Drama Theatre. Since 1999 he is the principal stage manager of Estonian Drama Theatre.

Besides theatre roles he has also appeared in a number of films and on television.

Awards
 2001: Order of the White Star, IV class.

Filmography

 1977: Põrgupõhja uus Vanapagan
 1980: Jõulud Vigalas
 2008: Detsembrikuumus
 2017: Mehetapja/Süütu/Vari

References

Living people
1954 births
Estonian male stage actors
Estonian male film actors
Estonian male television actors
20th-century Estonian male actors
21st-century Estonian male actors
Estonian theatre directors
Recipients of the Order of the White Star, 4th Class
Estonian Academy of Music and Theatre alumni
male actors from Tallinn